The Global TV Demand Awards is an American award that recognizes the most popular TV shows in the world. The entertainment industry's only data-backed award show, winning titles are selected by audience demand from 100+ countries in all languages.

Current Winners
2021

As certified by Guinness World Records:

 Most In-Demand TV Show in the World 2021: Attack on Titan
 Most In-Demand Anime Series of 2021: Attack on Titan
 Most In-Demand Asian Export of 2021: Yeh Rishta Kya Kehlata Hai
 Most In-Demand Book Adaptation of 2021: The Witcher
 Most In-Demand Children’s Series of 2021: SpongeBob SquarePants
 Most In-Demand Comedy Series of 2021: Brooklyn Nine-Nine
 Most In-Demand Documentary Series of 2021: A Perfect Planet
 Most In-Demand Drama Series of 2021: The Walking Dead
 Most In-Demand European Export of 2021: La Casa de Papel (Money Heist)
 Most In-Demand Horror Series of 2021: American Horror Story
 Most In-Demand Latin American Export of 2021: Dark Desire
 Most In-Demand Legacy Series of 2021: Dragon Ball Z
 Most In-Demand Reality Series of 2021: Shark Tank
 Most In-Demand Revolutionary Series of 2021: Squid Game
 Most In-Demand Sci-Fi & Fantasy Series of 2021: The Witcher
 Most In-Demand Series Debut of 2021: Squid Game
 Most In-Demand Superhero Series of 2021: WandaVision
 Most In-Demand Superhero Talent of 2021: Tom Hiddleston
 Most In-Demand True Crime Series of 2021: Q Into the Storm
 Exceptional Streaming Platform of 2021 : Disney+

Previous winners

2019

As certified by Guinness World Records:

 Most In-Demand TV Series in the World: Game of Thrones
 Most In-Demand Digital Original Series in the World: Stranger Things
 Most In-Demand Drama Series in the World: Game of Thrones
 Most In-Demand Comedy Series in the World: The Big Bang Theory
 Most In-Demand Documentary Series in the World: Planet Earth
 Most In-Demand Variety Series in the World: The Daily Show
 Most In-Demand Reality Series in the World: The Voice
 Most In-Demand Series Debut in the World: The Mandalorian
 Most In-Demand Superhero Series in the World: The Flash
 Most In-Demand Export from Latin America: La rosa de Guadalupe
 Most In-Demand Export from Asia: One-Punch Man
 Most In-Demand Export from Europe: Peaky Blinders

2018

As certified by Guinness World Records:

 Most In-Demand TV Series in the World: The Walking Dead
 Most In-Demand Digital Original in the World: Stranger Things

See also

 List of American television awards

References 

American television awards